Hot Haus is a reality television competition series aimed at finding the next queer sex symbol. The show premiered on January 27, 2022 on OUTtv. Hot Haus is the brainchild of the creative team behind Slag Wars. It is hosted by Tiffany “New York” Pollard and judged by rapper CupcakKe, social media personality Matt Camp, and trans activist Nicky Monet.

Season overview

Season 1

Contestants 
Names and cities stated are at time of filming.

Contestant progress 

   The contestant won Hot Haus.
  The contestant was a runner-up.
  The contestant won the Warm-up challenge.
  The contestant won the Inferno challenge.
  The contestant was safe.
  The contestant was in the bottom.
  The contestant was eliminated.

Season 2

Contestants 
Names and cities stated are at time of filming.

Reception 

Hot Haus has garnered widespread, positive reception. It was included in BuzzFeed’s 10 New Shows We’re Loving List, with the publication calling the show "challenging, fun, and queer as hell".

Dazed exclusively dropped the Hot Haus trailer. In their piece, Tiffany Pollard was quoted as saying, "I’ve been working in reality TV for a long time now, and I can promise you this cast is something special." CupcakKe told the magazine "Listen, listen, listen... listen, Linda! All jokes aside, this is hands down one of the more creative shows I have witnessed in a while. Hot Haus is the moment. It’s very different. It’s a great way to showcase the amazing talents coming from the LGBTQ+ community. It’s truly art." 

Fans on social media have rallied around the show, especially on TikTok, where it’s hashtag (#hothaus) has exceeded 3 million views. On March 16, 2022, Hot Haus was renewed for a second season.

See also 
 Slag Wars: The Next Destroyer
 Tiffany Pollard

References 

2020s LGBT-related reality television series
Reality web series
2022 Canadian television series debuts
OutTV (Canadian TV channel) original programming
2020s Canadian LGBT-related television series
Prostitution in television
Works about pornography
Canadian LGBT-related reality television series
Reality competition television series